Westboro may refer to:

Places

Canada
Westboro, Ottawa, Ontario, a neighbourhood
Westboro Station (OC Transpo), an OC Transpo Transitway Station

United States
Westboro (Topeka), Kansas, a residential neighborhood
Westboro, Missouri
Westboro, Ohio
Westboro, Wisconsin, a town
Westboro (CDP), Wisconsin, a census-designated place in the town

See also
Westborough (disambiguation)
Westboro Baptist Church